The "Mother Heroine" Title was an honorary award given to mothers and children in the People's Socialist Republic of Albania.

Definition
The title was given to mothers who had given birth, raised and educated 8 children or more in the spirit of socialist patriotism, with a love for work, with a sense of putting the general interest above their own, who were activists and had good working achievements.
This title was given to mothers when the children were alive and the youngest had reached the age of 1 year old. Children who were martyred during the National Liberation War or disappeared because of it and who did not have a bad political profile, as well as children who died in the line of duty for the national interest are counted as if they were alive.

See also
Orders, decorations and medals of Albania
Mother Heroine

References

Awards established in 1945
Title
Natalism